Michael Gregory (born November 26, 1944) is an American actor. With over 160 credits to his name, Gregory has appeared in character roles in television, films and commercials, as well as working as a voice actor in animation & video games.

Early life
He was born Gary Steven Meimar in Brooklyn, New York, the son of Sally and Angelo Socrates Meimar. He joined the United States army and served as a personnel specialist. He has an AA from Hartnell College and a BA from San Francisco State University. He lives in Salinas, California.

Career
Gregory had a role in an episode of the TV series The Partridge Family in 1971. Other guest appearances include All in the Family, Kojak, Gunsmoke, Fantasy Island, Voyagers!, The A-Team, The Love Boat, Quincy, Simon & Simon, Matlock, Murphy Brown, Quantum Leap, Ghost Whisperer, MacGyver (S06-E20) and Full House.

He originated the role of Dr. Rick Webber in episodes of the soap opera General Hospital, from 1976 to 1978, and played Nikolai in three episodes of Dynasty in 1985.

Selected filmographyMr. Ricco (1975) – TannerBeverly Hills Cop (1984) – Beverly Palms Hotel ManagerBand of the Hand (1986) – Van GuardRoboCop (1987) – Lieutenant HedgecockThe Couch Trip (1988) – Security at RivieraTotal Recall (1990) – Rebel LieutenantPrime Target (1991) – Agent RobbinsEraser (1996) – Leiman

Anime rolesThe Castle of Cagliostro - Goemon Ishikawa XIIICowboy Bebop – Laughing BullFushigi Yûgi – Mitsukake (OVA 1 only)Ghost in the Shell: Stand Alone Complex – Tsujisaki Ghost in the Shell: S.A.C. 2nd GIG – Renjo SokichiGhost in the Shell: Stand Alone Complex - Solid State Society – Chief NakamuraKikaider – Professor GillMobile Suit Gundam 0083: Stardust Memory – Alpha BateSol Bianca: The Legacy – GyunterSerial Experiments Lain – TotemTrigun – Brilliant Dynamites Neon

Video game rolesDota 2 – Bounty Hunter, Silencer, ClinkzStar Wars: The Old Republic – Commander Harron Tavus, Nomen KarrThe Horde – Kronus MaelorCyberpunk 2077'' – Viktor Vektor

References

External links
 
 

1944 births
Living people
American male film actors
American male television actors
American male voice actors
Hartnell College alumni
People from Brooklyn
People from Salinas, California
San Francisco State University alumni
United States Army soldiers